Choi Hong-Suk (born ) is a South Korean male volleyball player. He is part of the South Korea men's national volleyball team. On club level he plays for Seoul Woori Card Wibee.

References

External links
 profile at FIVB.org

1988 births
Living people
South Korean men's volleyball players
Place of birth missing (living people)
21st-century South Korean people